Stygnobia is a genus of leaf beetles found in the Samoan Islands and Fiji. It is a member of the subfamily Eumolpinae.

Species
The genus contains 13 species:
 Stygnobia aenescens  – Tutuila
 Stygnobia albiseta  – Central Fiji
 Stygnobia cauta  – Upolu, Tutuila, Savaiʻi, Manuʻa Islands (Taʻū)
 Stygnobia elliptica  – Viti Levu
 Stygnobia evansi  – Viti Levu, Ovalau, Taveuni
 Stygnobia leveri  – Viti Levu, Ovalau, Vanua Levu, Taveuni
 Stygnobia metallica  – Ovalau, Viti Levu, Vanua Levu, Taveuni
 Stygnobia minuta  – Upolu, Tutuila
 Stygnobia nandarivatu  – Viti Levu
 Stygnobia oconnori  – Ovalau, Viti Levu, Vanua Levu, Lau
 Stygnobia ovalaua  – Ovalau, Moala, Viti Levu
 Stygnobia variabilis  – Upolu, Tutuila, Savaiʻi
 Stygnobia vermiculicollis  – Upolu

References

Eumolpinae
Chrysomelidae genera
Beetles of Oceania
Fauna of Samoa
Invertebrates of American Samoa
Insects of Fiji
Taxa named by Julius Weise